
Gmina Strzelce Wielkie is a rural gmina (administrative district) in Pajęczno County, Łódź Voivodeship, in central Poland.

Villages
Gmina Strzelce Wielkie contains the villages and settlements of Antonina, Dębowiec Mały, Dębowiec Wielki, Górki, Marzęcice, Pomiary, Skąpa, Strzelce Wielkie, Wiewiec, Wistka, Wola Jankowska, Wola Wiewiecka, Zamoście-Kolonia and Zamoście-Wieś.

Neighbouring gminas
Gmina Strzelce Wielkie is bordered by the gminas of Ładzice, Lgota Wielka, Nowa Brzeźnica, Pajęczno, Rząśnia and Sulmierzyce.

References
Polish official population figures 2006

Strzelce Wielkie
Pajęczno County